Oligodon dorsalis, the Bengalese kukri snake, Gray's kukri snake, or spot-tailed kukri snake, is a species of snake. It is found in Northeast India, Bhutan, Bangladesh, Myanmar, and Thailand.

References

Further reading
 Boulenger, George A. 1890 The Fauna of British India, Including Ceylon and Burma. Reptilia and Batrachia. Taylor & Francis, London, xviii, 541 pp.
 Gray. J. E. 1834 Illustrations of Indian Zoology, chiefly selected from the collection of Major-General Hardwicke. Vol. 2. London (1833–1834): 263 pp., 95 plates

dorsalis
Snakes of Asia
Reptiles of Bangladesh
Reptiles of Bhutan
Reptiles of Myanmar
Snakes of India
Reptiles of Thailand
Reptiles described in 1834
Taxa named by John Edward Gray